António Rodrigues (29 October 1905 – 17 July 1994) was a Portuguese sprinter. He competed in the men's 100 metres at the 1932 Summer Olympics.

References

1905 births
1994 deaths
Athletes (track and field) at the 1932 Summer Olympics
Portuguese male sprinters
Olympic athletes of Portugal
Place of birth missing